Tippi or Tippie can refer to:

Tippi (name), list of people with the name
Tepi, Ethiopia, a town in Ethiopia
Tippi Airport, a former airport
Tippie College of Business, University of Iowa, United States
Tippi, a diacritic used in the Gurmukhi script

See also
Tippy (disambiguation)